The United States House of Representatives elections in California, 1920 was an election for California's delegation to the United States House of Representatives, which occurred as part of the general election of the House of Representatives on November 2, 1920. Republicans picked up two Democratic-held districts and defeated the lone Prohibition Party incumbent.

Overview

Delegation composition

Results
Final results from the Clerk of the House of Representatives:

District 1

District 2

District 3

District 4

District 5

District 6

District 7

District 8

District 9

District 10

District 11

See also
 67th United States Congress
 Political party strength in California
 Political party strength in U.S. states
 United States House of Representatives elections, 1920

References
 California Elections Page
 Office of the Clerk of the House of Representatives

External links
 California Legislative District Maps (1911-Present)
 RAND California Election Returns: District Definitions

United States House of Representatives
1920
California